Hessenstein Castle is a castle near Ederbringhausen in Vöhl in Landkreis Waldeck-Frankenberg in Hesse, Germany. It is situated on the hill of the Keseberg, 327 m above sea level. It was constructed between 1328 and 1342. It is used a youth hotel and center for educational meetings for protection of environment, run by the Naturschutzbund Hessen (NABU) and other organisations.

External links 

  Website of Jugendburg Hessenstein
  Burgenwelt: Hessenstein
  Website of Vöhl Community: Burg Hessenstein

Castles in Hesse
Hill castles
Buildings and structures in Waldeck-Frankenberg
Jugendburg